Mitscher may refer to:

People
Marc Mitscher (1887–1947),  United States Navy admiral
Oscar A. Mitscher, Early-day mayor of Oklahoma City, father of Admiral Marc Mitscher

Other 
Mitscher-class destroyer,  United States Navy experimental destroyer class
USS Mitscher (DL-2), Mitscher-class destroyer launched in January 1952 and decommissioned in 1980
USS Mitscher (DDG-57),Arleigh Burke-class destroyer commissioned in 1994